Superior Industries was an Australian bus bodybuilder in Brendale, Brisbane.

History
Superior Industries were a builder of truck and ambulance bodies in Virginia that in 1966 diversified into bus bodybuilding. In the late 1960s a large number of Leyland Leopards and in the mid-1980s some Leyland Tigers were bodied, but most bodies were mostly constructed on lighter chassis from Bedford and Ford and later Hino and Mercedes-Benz.

In 1980 Superior moved to a new factory in Brendale. Superior ceased trading in 1996 by which time it had bodied about 450 buses.

Further reading
Newsletter of the Queensland Omnibus & Coach Society issues 59-66 2002

References

Bus manufacturers of Australia
Australian companies disestablished in 1996
Australian companies established in 1966
Manufacturing companies disestablished in 1996
Manufacturing companies established in 1966